St. Kevin's College can refer to:
 St Kevin's College, Dublin, Ireland
 St Kevin's College, Lisnaskea, Northern Ireland
 St Kevin's College, Melbourne, Australia
 St Kevin's College, Oamaru, New Zealand